Brainerd Kellogg (August 15, 1834 – January 9, 1920) was born in Champlain, New York. He was a Tutor (1860–1861) and Professor of Rhetoric and English Literature (1861–1868) at Middlebury College in Vermont, United States. From 1868 to 1907 he was professor at the Brooklyn Polytechnic Institute. He published a number of influential education books, some of which are available on Project Gutenberg.

Kellogg was the author of Rhetoric; History of the English Language. With Alonzo Reed, he jointly authored Graded Lessons in English; Higher Lessons in English; A One Book Course. He authored a variety of textbooks on English writing and literature, including a series on the works of William Shakespeare.

Most methods of sentence diagramming in pedagogy are based on the Reed-Kellogg sentence diagram from the book Higher Lessons in English, first published in 1877, though the method has been updated with recent understanding of grammar. Reed and Kellogg were preceded, and their work probably informed, by W. S. Clark, who published his "balloon" method of depicting grammar in his 1847 book A Practical Grammar: In Which Words, Phrases & Sentences are Classified According to Their Offices and Their Various Relationships to Each Another.

Personal life
Kellogg married Julia Rogers Cutter on August 19, 1862 and had a son and daughter: Frederick  and Julia [Mrs. S. Vilas Beckwith]. Kellogg died in Morristown, New Jersey on January 9, 1920.

References

External links

American educational theorists
1834 births
1920 deaths